John Whitaker Maitland (1831-1909) was the rector of Loughton, lord of the manor, and owner of Loughton Hall.

Early life
He was the third son of William Whitaker Maitland, landowner and High Sheriff of Essex. He was educated at Harrow School, and Trinity Hall, Cambridge.

Career

Loughton Hall had been destroyed by fire in 1836, and after Maitland received £30,000 from the City of London for enclosing parts of Epping Forest which he owned, he rebuilt in 1878.

It was designed by William Eden Nesfield in a mock Jacobean style.

Personal life
He married Venetia Neave, daughter of Sir Digby Neave, 3rd Baronet and Hon. Mary Arundell.

He is the grandfather of the politician Sir John Maitland through his son William Whitaker Maitland.

References

1831 births
1909 deaths
People educated at Harrow School
Alumni of Trinity Hall, Cambridge
John Whitaker
19th-century British businesspeople